Artashes Minasian (sometimes transliterated as Minasyan; ; born 21 January 1967) is an Armenian chess grandmaster. He won the USSR Chess Championship in 1991 and is a six-time Armenian Chess Champion.

Chess career

He participated in eight Chess Olympiads with a record of +23 −12 =28. In 2006 the Armenian team took the first place at the 37th Chess Olympiad. Along with himself, the team consisted of Levon Aronian, Vladimir Akopian, Karen Asrian, Smbat Lputian, Gabriel Sargissian). Minasian won the Armenian Chess Championship six times, in 1990, 1992, 1993, 1995, 2004 and 2006. He also won the final USSR Chess Championship in 1991 and New York open championship in 1998.

In December 2009, he was awarded the title of Honoured Master of Sport of the Republic of Armenia.

References

Notable chess games
Kateryna Lahno vs Artashes Minasian, 6th Aeroflot Festival 2007, Caro-Kann Defense: Classical Variation (B18), 0-1
Artashes Minasian vs Tigran Nalbandian, Armenian Championship 2008, Nimzo-Larsen Attack: Modern Variation (A01), 1–0
Artashes Minasian vs Loek Van Wely, Philadelphia 1994, Pirc Defense: Byrne Variation (B07), 1-0

External links

Artashes Minasian Grandmaster Games Database at RedHotPawn.com

Artashes Minasian player profile at Chessmetrics

1967 births
Living people
Chess grandmasters
Chess Olympiad competitors
Armenian chess players
Sportspeople from Yerevan
Soviet chess players